The 2008 ASEAN Para Games, officially known as the 4th ASEAN Para Games, was a Southeast Asian disabled multi-sport event held in Nakhon Ratchasima, Thailand from 20 to 26 January 2008, one month after the 2007 Southeast Asian Games. This was the first time Thailand hosted the ASEAN Para Games.

Around 1000 athletes from 11 participating nations participated at the games which featured 488 events in 14 sports. Thailand is the fourth nation to host the games after Malaysia, Vietnam and the Philippines. The games was opened and by Surayud Chulanont, the Prime Minister of Thailand at the 80th Birthday Stadium.

The final medal tally was led by host Thailand, followed by Malaysia and Vietnam. Several Games and national records were broken during the games. The games were deemed generally successful with the rising standard of disabled sports competition amongst the Southeast Asian nations.

Development and preparation
The 4th ASEAN Para Games Organising Committee was formed to oversee the staging of the games.

Venues
The 4th ASEAN Para Games had 14 venues for the games.

Marketing

Logo
 
The logo of the 2008 ASEAN Para Games is the Chumpol Gate, a historical place in Nakhon Ratchasima, Thailand. Chumpol Gate represents victory. It also denotes the exquisite Thai art and culture. Curvy blue and red lines represent the pageantry of fluttering flags leading eager, excited athletes marching into the stadium.
The ASEAN Para Sports Federation logo sits in the center of the emblem, representing friendship and co-operation between participants from ASEAN countries.

Mascot
The mascot of the 2008 ASEAN Para Games, is a dove named Nok-Khao karom which is recognised as a symbol of Nakhon Ratchasima Province. Nok-Khao Karom is a local animal name of Nakhon Ratchasima for dove. Karom is described as a wise, cheerful, gentle, and friendly, reflecting the characteristics of Thai people. The name of the dove is also the abbreviation of the games' values namely, Kind, Appreciation, Reliable, Optimistic, and Manners.

The games

Opening ceremony
The opening ceremony was held at the 80th Birthday Stadium on 20 January 2008 at 19:00 (TST). The games was declared opened by Thai Prime Minister Surayud Chulanont.

Closing ceremony
The closing ceremony was held at the 80th Birthday Stadium on 26 January 2008 at 19:00 (TST). The ASEAN Para Games responsibilities was officially handed over to Malaysia, host of the 2009 ASEAN Para Games after Laos, the host of the 2009 Southeast Asian Games, declined to host the games, citing financial difficulties.

Participating nations

Sports

  Archery
  Athletics
  Badminton
  Boccia
  Chess
  Wheelchair fencing
  Goalball
  Judo
  Powerlifting
  Shooting
  Swimming
  Table tennis
  Wheelchair basketball
  Wheelchair tennis

Medal table
A total of 1052 medals comprising 488 gold medals, 320 silver medals and 244 bronze medals were awarded to athletes. The Host Thailand's performance was their best ever yet in ASEAN Para Games History and emerged as overall champion of the games.

Key
 Host nation (Thailand)

See also
 2007 Southeast Asian Games

References

External links
 2008 ASEAN Para Games official website, Archive.org mirror of official website
 Public relations website

ASEAN Para Games
ASEAN Para Games
ASEAN Para Games
ASEAN Para Games
ASEAN Para Games
ASEAN Para Games
ASEAN Para Games